SC Pick Szeged is a Hungarian handball club from Szeged, that plays in the Nemzeti Bajnokság I and the EHF Champions League.

The current name of the club is OTP Bank - Pick Szeged due to sponsorship reasons.

Crest, colours, supporters

Naming history

Kit manufacturers and shirt sponsor
The following table shows in detail SC Pick Szeged kit manufacturers and shirt sponsors by year:

Kits

Sports Hall information

Name: – Pick Aréna
City: – Szeged
Capacity: – 8143
Address: – 6723 Szeged, Felső Tisza-Part 1-3.

Team

Current squad
Squad for the 2022–23 season

Goalkeepers
 16  Roland Mikler
 32  Mirko Alilović
 77  Luka Krivokapić
Left Wingers
 25  Sebastian Frimmel
 71  Alexander Blonz
Right Wingers
 17  Bogdan Radivojević
 24  Mario Šoštarič
Line players
 22  Matej Gaber 
 27  Bence Bánhidi (c) 
 45  Miklós Rosta 

Left Backs
9  Richárd Bodó
 21  Zoltán Szita
 51  Borut Mačkovšek
Central Backs
 10  Miguel Martins
 44  Dean Bombač
Right Backs
5  Kent Robin Tønnesen
7  Luka Stepančić
 41  Imanol Garciandia

Transfers
Transfers for the 2023–24 season

 Joining
  Michael Apelgren (Head Coach) (from  IK Sävehof) ? 
  Emil Kheri Imsgard (GK) (from  Elverum Håndball)

 Leaving
  Juan Carlos Pastor (Head Coach) (to  Egypt)
  Mirko Alilović (GK) (to  Wisła Płock)
  Alexander Blonz (LW) (to  GOG Håndbold)
  Kent Robin Tønnesen (RB) (to  Paris Saint-Germain) 
  Miklós Rosta (P) (to  Dinamo București) ?

Staff members
  Head Coach: Juan Carlos Pastor
  Assistant Coach: Marko Krivokapić
  Goalkeeping Coach: Nenad Damjanovics
  Club Doctor: István Szabó, MD
  Masseur: Đorđe Ignjatović

Previous squads

Top scorers

Retired numbers

Honours

Recent seasons

Seasons in Nemzeti Bajnokság I: 43
Seasons in Nemzeti Bajnokság I/B: 6
Seasons in Nemzeti Bajnokság II: 4

In European competition

Participations in Champions League: 18x
Participations in EHF Cup (IHF Cup): 10x
Participations in Challenge Cup (City Cup): 3x
Participations in Cup Winners' Cup (IHF Cup Winners' Cup): 6x

Former club members

Notable former players

 Gábor Ancsin (2011–2016)
 Szabolcs Zubai (2008–2018)
 György Avar
 Béla Árvai
 Sándor Bajusz
 Zsolt Balogh (2012–2019)
 Bence Bánhidi (2016–  )
 Zoltán Bartalos
 Csaba Bartók (1990–2000)
 Csaba Bendó
 Róbert Berta
 Richárd Bodó (2016–  )
 Dániel Buday (1999–2003; 2011–2013)
 Ferenc Buday
 József Czina (2004–2005, 2011–2014)
  Nikola Eklemović (1999–2004)
 József Farkas
 Bálint Fekete (2011–2018)
 Róbert Fekete (1985–1987, 1989–1996, 2001)
 Máté Gidai
 Márk Hegedűs
 Gábor Herbert (2005–2011)
 Ferenc Ilyés (2000–2007; 2013–2016)
 Dávid Katzirz (2008–2011)
  Marinko Kekezović (2012–2014)
 Attila Kotormán
  Milorad Krivokapić (2005–2010)
 Balázs Laluska (1998–2005, 2008–2009)
 Ambrus Lele
 Máté Lékai (2010–2012)
 Richárd Mezei
 Roland Mikler (2010–2014)
 László Nagy (1997–2000)
 Béla Oláh
 Zoltán Oláh
 Zsolt Perger
  Nenad Puljezević (2002–2009)
 Miklós Rosta (2019–)
 László Skaliczki
 István Sándor
 László Szabó "Sonka"
 Sándor Tamás
 Endre Tenke
 Géza Tóth
  Mihály Tóth
 Szabolcs Törő (2010–2012)
 Attila Vadkerti (2000–2015)
 Péter Tatai (2010–2014)
 Sebastian Frimmel (2021–) 
 Nikola Prce (2013–2014)
 Vladimir Vranješ (2013–2016)
 Thiagus Petrus (2015–2018)
 Mario Bjeliš (2008–2009)
 Mirko Alilović (2018–  )
 Igor Kos (2009–2010)
 Ivan Sršen (2018)
 Marin Šego (2016–2019)
 Antonio Pribanić (2011–2013)
 Denis Buntic (2016–2017)
 Alen Blažević (2012–2020)
 Luka Stepančić (2019–  )
 Stanislav Kašpárek (2018–2021)
 Stefán Rafn Sigurmannsson (2017–2021)
 Maxim Butenko 
 Ratko Đurković (2004–2008)
 Marko Lasica (2013–2014)
 Vladimir Osmajić (2007–2010)
 Alexander Blonz (2021–  )
 Kent Robin Tønnesen (2021–  )
 Miguel Martins (2021–  )
 Valentin Ghionea (2007–2010)
 Iulian Stamate
 Adrian Petrea
 Sergei Gorbok (2016–2018)
 Dmitry Zhitnikov (2017–2021)
 Danijel Anđelković (2004–2010)
 Dalibor Brajdić
 Marko Ćuruvija (2015–2016)
 Nedeljko Jovanović (2006–2007)
 Dragan Marjanac (2007–2010)
 Vladan Matić (2002–2007)
 Petar Nenadić (2008–2010)
 Dusan Beocanin 
 Nenad Peruničić (2005–2006)
 Bogdan Radivojević (2019–)
 Rajko Prodanović (2011–2013, 2014–2016)
 František Šulc (2010–2014)
 Martin Straňovský (2020–2021)
 Tomáš Straňovský (2009–2011)
 Luka Žvižej (2007–2010)
 Dean Bombač (2014–2016, 2018–)
 Matej Gaber (2016–)
 Nik Henigman (2018–2022)
 Borut Mačkovšek (2020–)
 Mario Šoštarič (2016–)
 Staš Skube (2016–2018)
 Niko Mindegía (2013–2016)
 Roberto García Parrondo (2013–2016)
 José Manuel Sierra (2014–2018)
 Antonio García Robledo (2014–2016)
 Jorge Maqueda (2018–2020)
 Joan Cañellas (2018–2021)
 Imanol Garciandia (2021–)
 Jonas Källman (2014–2021)
 Jonas Larholm (2012–2014)

Notable coaches

See also
 Pick Szeged

References

External links
  
 OTP Bank - Pick Szeged at EHF 

Hungarian handball clubs
 
Handball clubs established in 1961
Sport in Szeged